Babalwa Mathulelwa is a South African politician serving as a Member of the National Assembly since June 2020. She is a party representative of the Economic Freedom Fighters.

Biography
Mathulelwa had worked as a domestic worker, cashier and a monitoring practitioner for the Eastern Cape Department of Transport, prior to becoming active in politics. She joined the EFF and became a branch chairperson. She was an additional member of the party's Alfred Nzo Regional Command Team.

In December 2019, Mathulelwa was elected to serve on the Central Command Team, the EFF's highest decision-making structure, as an additional member.

In June 2020, Mathulelwa was sworn in as a Member of the National Assembly. As of July 2020, she serves on the  Portfolio Committee on Small Business Development.

References

External links

Living people
Xhosa people
Year of birth missing (living people)
Members of the National Assembly of South Africa
Women members of the National Assembly of South Africa
Economic Freedom Fighters politicians
21st-century South African politicians